Nutini is a surname. Notable people with the surname include:

 Hugo Nutini (1929–2013), Italian-born Chilean and subsequently American professor of anthropology
 Paolo Nutini (born 1987), Scottish singer, songwriter, and musician

Italian-language surnames